Port-au-peck is an unincorporated community located within Oceanport in Monmouth County, New Jersey, United States. The name Port-Au-Peck comes from the Lenape name Pootapeck. The land was "sold" to English interests in 1670; however, it is unclear how fair this land transfer was or if the local residents were aware they were giving away their hunting and fishing rights in the transfer.

Geography
It is the area north-north-east of the New Jersey Transit Monmouth Park line. It forms a peninsula jutting into the Shrewsbury River and is formed in the shape of a mitten or to some a fox.

Demography
While no specific data is taken for Port-au-peck (as it is not census recognized) the neighborhood would be considered by most to be middle class to upper-middle class and is mostly, almost 100% white. Port-au-peck is higher income and more residential than the Eatontown side of Oceanport proper.

ZIP Code
Port-au-peck uses the same ZIP Code (07757) as Oceanport, which has only one post office.  Because of this Port-au-peck has been somewhat forgotten in the past years. Few residents in Oceanport use Port-au-peck as a mailing address.

References

External links
 Port-au-Peck Chemical Hose Company No. 1

Oceanport, New Jersey
Unincorporated communities in Monmouth County, New Jersey
Unincorporated communities in New Jersey